Joo Da-young (born June 16, 1995) is a South Korean actress. She graduated from Chung-Ang University, Department of Theater and Film in 2014. She started her acting career as a child actress in 1999 with  KBS1 television series TV Novel: Sister’s Mirror and TV Novel: Plum Sonata (2001). She has appeared in television series Dae Jang Geum (2003), Twinkle Twinkle (2011),  Feast of the Gods (2012) and 2016 film Pure Love, among many others. She adopted the stage name Joo Ah-reum in 2018. She is appearing in romance TV series, Be My Dream Family in (2021).

Filmography

Film

Television series

Music video

Discography

References

External links
 Joo Ah-reum at Naver 
 
 
 

1995 births
Living people
South Korean child actresses
South Korean television actresses
South Korean film actresses
Chung-Ang University alumni